AOB may refer to:

 Accessory olfactory bulb, the dorsal-posterior region of the main olfactory bulb
 Ace of Base, a Swedish pop group
 ammonia-oxidizing bacteria
 Angle of bank, in aviation
 Angle On the Bow, a variable in nautical rangekeeping
 open bite, in dentistry
 Antioxidant of bamboo leaves 
 Antyfaszystowska Organizacja Bojowa
 Assignment of Benefits, medical terminology
 Any Other Business, an agenda item for free miscellaneous points
 Austin O'Brien Catholic High School, a Catholic Senior High School in Edmonton, Alberta, Canada
 Ammonia-oxidizing bacteria, a type of Nitrifying bacteria

AoB may refer to:

 Array of Bytes 

aob may refer to:

 Abom language, a nearly extinct language spoken in Papua New Guinea (ISO 639-3 code)